Otto Rumpf (27 September 1902 – 3 October 1984) was a German sculptor.

Life 
Born in Obermoschel, Rumpf was the progenitor of the Kaiserslautern Rumpf family of sculptors. He was married to the sculptor Martha Jung (1910–1996). Their son is the sculptor Gernot Rumpf.

Rumpf first learned in the sculpture workshop of his father Ludwig Rumpf, from 1926 to 1933 he attended the Academy of Fine Arts in Munich and was a student of Hermann Hahn. From 1934 to 1943 he headed the sculpture department of the "Meisterschule des Deutschen Handwerk" in Kaiserslautern. Among his students here from 1938 to 1942 was Erich Koch, in the years 1975 to 1990 professor at the Academy of Fine Arts Munich.

In addition to his artistic activities, he taught again at the Kaiserslautern master school from 1960-1965.

Rumpd died in Bad Dürkheim at the age of 82.

Work 
 1951: Frederick II, Holy Roman Emperor, Außenfigur am Rathaus Annweiler
 1953: Europa auf dem Stier, Electoral Palace, Koblenz (Skulptur am nördlichen Treppenaufgang, Innenbereich)
 1964: Kriegerdenkmal Neuleiningen, St. Georg

References

Further reading 
 Rumpf, Otto
 Viktor Carl: Lexikon Pfälzer Personlichkeiten Hennig Verlag, Edenkoben 2004, 
 Werner Hänsler: Vom Schaffen eines Pfälzer Künstlers. Kurzer Besuch bei Otto Rumpf in seinem Lachener Atelier. In Die Rheinpfalz and the Speyerer Tagespost, 26 July 1958

External links 
 Daten zu Otto Rumpf und seinen Familienangehörigen
 

20th-century German sculptors
1902 births
1984 deaths
People from Donnersbergkreis